Charles Booker may refer to:
Charles Booker (American politician) (born 1984), member of the Kentucky House of Representatives
Charles Dawson Booker (1897–1918), English World War I fighter ace
Charles Goodenough Booker (1859–1926), Canadian politician, mayor of Hamilton, Ontario from 1917 to 1920
Charles Joseph Booker (1865–1925), Australian politician, member of the Queensland Legislative Assembly

See also
Charles Booher (disambiguation)
Charles Brooker (1932–2020), Canadian ice hockey player